The 1991 Mid-American Conference men's basketball tournament took place March 8–10, 1991, at Cobo Arena in Detroit, Michigan. Eastern Michigan defeated , 67–66 in the championship game, to win its second MAC Tournament title.

The Eagles earned an automatic bid to the 1991 NCAA tournament as #12 seed in the East region.

Format
Eight of nine conference members participated, with play beginning in the quarterfinal round.  was left out of the tournament field.

Bracket

References

1991
Tournament
MAC men's basketball tournament
MAC men's basketball tournament